In Māori tradition, Te Rangimātoru was one of the great ocean-going, voyaging canoes that was used in the migrations that settled New Zealand. Te Rangimātoru landed at Ohiwa and was commanded by Hape-ki-tu-manui-o-te-rangi (who later died in the South Island).

See also
List of Māori waka

References

Māori waka
Māori mythology